Libgcrypt is a cryptography library developed as a separated module of GnuPG.
It can also be used independently of GnuPG, but depends on its error-reporting library Libgpg-error.

It provides functions for all fundamental cryptographic building blocks:

Libgcrypt features its own multiple precision arithmetic implementation, with assembler implementations for a variety of processors, including Alpha, AMD64, HP PA-RISC, i386, i586, M68K, MIPS 3, PowerPC, and SPARC.  It also features an entropy gathering utility, coming in different versions for Unix-like and Windows machines.

Usually multiple, stable branches of Libgcrypt are maintained in parallel; since 2022-03-28 this is the Libgrypt 1.10 branch as stable branch, plus the 1.8 branch as LTS ("long-term support") branch, which will be maintained at least until 2024-12-31.

See also 

 Comparison of cryptography libraries

References

Cryptographic software
Free security software
GNU Project software
OpenPGP
2020 software